The Minister for Agriculture, Fisheries and Forestry is an Australian Government cabinet position which is currently held by Murray Watt in the Albanese ministry since 1 June 2022, following the Australian federal election in 2022.

In the Government of Australia, the minister administers this portfolio through the Department of Agriculture, Fisheries and Forestry.

Portfolio responsibilities

In addition to the Department of Agriculture, Water and the Environment, component bodies responsible to the minister include:
 Australian Bureau of Agricultural and Resource Economics
 Australian Quarantine and Inspection Service
 Biosecurity Australia
 Bureau of Rural Sciences

Other bodies within the portfolio are:
 Australian Egg Corporation
 Australian Fisheries Management Authority
 Australian Landcare Council
 Australian Livestock Export Corporation Limited
 Australian Pesticides and Veterinary Medicines Authority (formerly National Registration Authority for Agricultural and Veterinary Chemicals)
 Australian Pork Limited
 Australian Wine and Brandy Corporation
 Australian Wool Innovation Limited
 Cotton Research and Development Corporation
 Dairy Adjustment Authority
 Dairy Australia
 Fisheries Research and Development Corporation
 Forest and Wood Products Research and Development Corporation
 Grains Research and Development Corporation
 Grape and Wine Research and Development Corporation
 Horticulture Australia Limited
 Meat and Livestock Australia
 Murray-Darling Basin Authority
 Murray-Darling Basin Ministerial Council
 National Consultative Committee on Animal Welfare
 National Land and Water Resources Audit
 National Rural Advisory Council
 Natural Resource Management Ministerial Council
 Northern Territory Fisheries Joint Authority
 Plant Breeder's Rights Office
 Quarantine and Exports Advisory Council
 Primary Industries Ministerial Council
 Queensland Fisheries Joint Authority
 Rural Industries Research and Development Corporation
 Statutory Fishing Rights Allocation Review Panel
 Sugar Research and Development Corporation
 Torres Strait Protected Zone Joint Authority
 Western Australian Fisheries Joint Authority
 Wheat Export Authority

List of agriculture ministers
The following individuals have been appointed as Minister for Agriculture, or any of its precedent titles:

Notes
 Barnard was part of a two-man ministry comprising Barnard and Gough Whitlam for fourteen days until the full ministry was commissioned.

List of junior ministers within the portfolio
The following individuals have been appointed as junior ministers in the agriculture portfolio or any of its precedent titles.

See also 
 Minister for Agriculture (Victoria)

References

External links
 

Agriculture, Fisheries and Forestry